Even before the launch of Sputnik 1, there were various types of launch vehicle designs. The launch vehicle designs described below are either canceled or never left the drawing board.

20th century

21st century

See also

Comparison of orbital launch systems
Non-rocket spacelaunch
List of orbital launch systems
List of private spaceflight companies#Crew and cargo transport vehicles
Spaceplane
List of crewed lunar lander designs

Further reading
 SP-4221 The Space Shuttle Decision Chapter 8 (NASA)

T.A. Heppenheimer  - SP-4221 The Space Shuttle Decision (NASA, 1998)

External links
Encyclopedia Astronautica - orbital launch vehicle
INTRODUCTION TO FUTURE LAUNCH VEHICLE PLANS [1963-2001] by Marcus Lindroos (Updated 6/15/2001)
Space Future - Vehicle Designs
Category:Proposed or planned spacecraft (Wikimedia Commons)
10 Space Shuttles which never flew (Lockheed Starclipper, Chrysler SERV, Phase B Shuttles, Rockwell C-1057, Shuttle C, Air Launched Sortie Vehicle (ALSV), Hermes, Buran, Shuttle II, Lockheed Martin VentureStar)

Canceled launch vehicle designs